Petrovsky is an urban locality (an urban-type settlement) in Gavrilovo-Posadsky District of Ivanovo Oblast, Russia. Population:

References

Urban-type settlements in Ivanovo Oblast
Suzdalsky Uyezd